John Mackintosh Howie  (23 May 1936 – 26 December 2011) was a Scottish mathematician and prominent semigroup theorist.

Biography
Howie was educated at Robert Gordon's College, Aberdeen, the University of Aberdeen and Balliol College, Oxford, where he wrote a Ph.D. thesis under the direction of Graham Higman.

In 1966 University of Stirling was established with Walter D. Munn (fr) at head of the department of mathematics. Munn recruited Howie to teach there.

According to Christopher Hollings,
...a 'British school' of semigroup theory cannot be said to have taken off properly until the mid-1960s when John M. Howie completed an Oxford DPhil in semigroup theory (partly under Preston's influence) and Munn began to supervise research students in semigroups (most notably, Norman R. Reilly).

He won the Keith Prize of the Royal Society of Edinburgh, 1979–81. He was Regius Professor of Mathematics at the University of St Andrews from 1970–1997. No successor to this chair was named until 2015 when Igor Rivin was appointed.

Howie was charged with reviewing universal, comprehensive secondary education in Scotland, which was viewed as failing its students. Impressed with education in Denmark, his committee proposed a tracking scheme to improve academic outcomes, and communicated recommendations in Upper Secondary Education in Scotland (1992).

Public appointments
 Mathematics Panel, Scottish Examination Board 1967–73; Convener from 1970
 Chairman, Scottish Central Committee for Mathematics 1975–81
 President, Edinburgh Mathematical Society 1973–74
 London Mathematical Society :
 Council 1982-88, 1989–92
 Vice-president 1986–88, 1990–92
 Chairman of Education Committee 1985–89
 Chairman of Public Affairs Committee 1990–92
 Member of Dunning Committee 1975–77
 Chairman of Governors, Dundee College of Education 1983–87
 Governor, Northern College of Education 1987–2001
 Chairman, Scottish Mathematical Council 1987–93
 Chairman, Committee to review fifth and sixth years (Howie Committee) 1990-92
 Council, Royal Society of Edinburgh 1992–1995
 Chairman, Steering Committee, International Centre for Mathematical Sciences 1991-97.

Books
 1976: An Introduction to Semigroup Theory, Academic Press 
 1991: Automata and Languages, Clarendon Press  
 1992: Upper Secondary Education in Scotland (Howie Report)
 1995: Fundamentals of Semigroup Theory, Clarendon Press  
 2001: Real Analysis, Springer books  
 2003: Complex Analysis, Springer books  
 2006: Fields and Galois Theory, Springer books

References

External links
 
 
 

1936 births
2011 deaths
Scientists from Aberdeen
People educated at Robert Gordon's College
Fellows of the Royal Society of Edinburgh
Alumni of the University of Aberdeen
Alumni of Balliol College, Oxford
Academics of the University of St Andrews
Commanders of the Order of the British Empire
20th-century Scottish mathematicians
British textbook writers
Sir Edmund Whittaker Memorial Prize winners